Zheleznodorozhnogo razezda №6 is a rural locality (a settlement) in Yandykovsky Selsoviet, Limansky District, Astrakhan Oblast, Russia. The population was 287 as of 2010.

Geography 
Zheleznodorozhnogo razezda №6 is located 17 km northwest of Liman (the district's administrative centre) by road. Yandyki is the nearest rural locality.

References 

Rural localities in Limansky District